Adam Bielecki is the name of:

 Adam Bielecki (climber) (born 1983), Polish alpine and high-altitude climber
 Adam Bielecki (mathematician)  (1910–2003), Polish mathematician